Dalland is a surname. Notable people with the surname include:

 Birgit Dalland (1907–2007), Norwegian politician 
 Bjarne Dalland (1906–1943), Norwegian trade unionist and politician
 Randulf Dalland (1900–1984), Norwegian politician